Aleksandr Novikov (born 30 October 1985) is a Belarusian rower. He competed in the men's quadruple sculls event at the 2008 Summer Olympics.

References

External links
 
 

1985 births
Living people
Belarusian male rowers
Olympic rowers of Belarus
Rowers at the 2008 Summer Olympics
Sportspeople from Minsk